In mathematics, a building (also Tits building, named after Jacques Tits) is a combinatorial and geometric structure which simultaneously  generalizes certain aspects of flag manifolds, finite projective planes, and Riemannian symmetric spaces. Buildings were initially introduced by Jacques Tits as a means to understand the structure of exceptional groups of Lie type. The more specialized theory of Bruhat–Tits buildings (named also after François Bruhat) plays a role in the study of -adic Lie groups analogous to that of the theory of symmetric spaces in the theory of Lie groups.

Overview

The notion of a building was invented by Jacques Tits as a means of describing simple algebraic groups over an arbitrary field. The group  imposes very strong combinatorial regularity conditions on the complexes  that can arise in this fashion. By treating these conditions as axioms for a class of simplicial complexes, Tits arrived at his first definition of a building. A part of the data defining a building  is a Coxeter group , which determines a highly symmetrical simplicial complex , called the Coxeter complex. When  is a finite Coxeter group, the Coxeter complex is a topological sphere, and the corresponding buildings are said to be of spherical type. When  is an affine Weyl group, the Coxeter complex is a subdivision of the affine plane and one speaks of affine, or Euclidean, buildings. An affine building of type  is the same as an infinite tree without terminal vertices.

Although the theory of semisimple algebraic groups provided the initial motivation for the notion of a building, not all buildings arise from a group. In particular, projective planes and generalized quadrangles form two classes of graphs studied in incidence geometry which satisfy the axioms of a building, but may not be connected with any group. This phenomenon turns out to be related to the low rank of the corresponding Coxeter system (namely, two). Tits proved a remarkable theorem: all spherical buildings of rank at least three are connected with a group; moreover, if a building of rank at least two is connected with a group then the group is essentially determined by the building.

Iwahori–Matsumoto, Borel–Tits and Bruhat–Tits demonstrated that in analogy with Tits' construction of spherical buildings, affine buildings can also be constructed from certain groups, namely, reductive algebraic groups over a local non-Archimedean field. Furthermore, if the split rank of the group is at least three, it is essentially determined by its building. Tits later reworked the foundational aspects of the theory of buildings using the notion of a chamber system, encoding the building solely in terms of adjacency properties of simplices of maximal dimension; this leads to simplifications in both spherical and affine cases. He proved that, in analogy with the spherical case, every building of affine type and rank at least four arises from a group.

Definition
An -dimensional building  is an abstract simplicial complex which is a union of subcomplexes  called apartments such that

 any two simplices in  lie in some common apartment ;

The rank of the  building is defined to be .

Elementary properties
Every apartment  in a building is a Coxeter complex. Since the apartment  is determined up to isomorphism by the building, the same is true of any two simplices in  lying in some common apartment . When  is finite, the building is said to be spherical. When it is an affine Weyl group, the building is said to be affine or Euclidean.

The chamber system is the adjacency graph formed by the chambers; each pair of adjacent chambers can in addition be labelled by one of the standard
generators of the Coxeter group (see ).

Every building has a canonical length metric inherited from the geometric realisation obtained by identifying the vertices with an orthonormal basis of a Hilbert space. For affine buildings, this metric satisfies the  comparison inequality of Alexandrov, known in this setting as the Bruhat–Tits non-positive curvature condition for geodesic triangles: the distance from a vertex to the midpoint of the opposite side is no greater than the distance in the corresponding Euclidean triangle with the same side-lengths (see ).

Connection with  pairs
If a group  acts simplicially on a building , transitively on pairs  of chambers  and apartments  containing them, then the stabilisers of such a pair define a  pair or Tits system. In fact the pair of subgroups

 and 

Conversely the building can be recovered from the  pair, so that every  pair canonically defines a building. In fact, using the terminology of  pairs and calling any conjugate of  a Borel subgroup and any group containing a Borel subgroup a parabolic subgroup,

 the vertices of the building  correspond to maximal parabolic subgroups;
  vertices form a -simplex whenever the intersection of the corresponding maximal parabolic subgroups is also parabolic;
 apartments are conjugates under  of the simplicial subcomplex with vertices given by conjugates under  of maximal parabolics containing .

The same building can often be described by different  pairs. Moreover, not every building comes from a  pair: this corresponds to the failure of classification results in low rank and dimension (see below).

Spherical and affine buildings for 
In this case there are three different buildings, two spherical and one affine. Each is a union of apartments, themselves simplicial complexes.

Each building is a simplicial complex  which has to satisfy the following axioms:

  is a union of apartments.
 If a simplex is contained in two apartments, there is a simplicial isomorphism of one onto the other fixing all common points.

Spherical building
Maximal connectivity is obtained by taking  proper non-trivial subspaces and the corresponding -simplex corresponds to a complete flag

 

Lower dimensional simplices correspond to partial flags with fewer intermediary subspaces .

Now an ordered frame  defines a complete flag via

 

The axioms for a building can easily be verified using the classical Schreier refinement argument used to prove the uniqueness of the Jordan–Hölder decomposition.

Affine building
Let  be the subring of  defined by

where each successive quotient has order .

The second axiom follows by a variant of the Schreier refinement argument. The last axiom follows by a simple counting argument based on the orders of finite Abelian groups of the form

In particular taking , it follows that  is countable. On the other hand, taking , the definition shows that  admits a natural simplicial action on the building.

for  sufficiently large. Any simplicial automorphism  of  defines a permutation  of  such that .

.

Automorphisms
Since automorphisms of the building permute the labels, there is a natural homomorphism

.

The action of  gives rise to an -cycle . Other automorphisms of the building arise from outer automorphisms of  associated with automorphisms of the Dynkin diagram. Taking the standard symmetric bilinear form with orthonormal basis , the map sending a lattice to its dual lattice gives an automorphism whose square is the identity, giving the permutation  that sends each label to its negative modulo .

Geometric relations
Spherical buildings arise in two quite different ways in connection with the affine building  for :

 The link of each vertex  in the affine building corresponds to submodules of  under the finite field .

Bruhat–Tits trees with complex multiplication

When  is an archimedean local field then on the building for the group  an additional structure can be imposed of a building with complex multiplication. These were first introduced by Martin L. Brown . These buildings arise when a quadratic extension of  acts on the vector space . These building with complex multiplication can be extended to any global field. They  describe  the action of the Hecke operators on  Heegner points on the classical modular curve  as well as on the Drinfeld modular curve .

Classification
Tits proved that all irreducible spherical buildings (i.e. with finite Weyl group) of rank greater than 2 are associated to simple algebraic or classical groups.

A similar result holds for irreducible affine buildings of dimension greater than 2 (their buildings "at infinity" are spherical of rank greater than two). In lower rank or dimension, there is no such classification. Indeed, each incidence structure gives a spherical building of rank 2 (see ); and Ballmann and Brin proved that every 2-dimensional simplicial complex in which the links of vertices are isomorphic to the flag complex of a finite projective plane has the structure of a building, not necessarily classical. Many 2-dimensional affine buildings have been constructed using hyperbolic reflection groups or other more exotic constructions connected with orbifolds.

Tits also proved that every time a building is described by a  pair in a group, then in almost all cases the automorphisms of the building correspond to automorphisms of the group (see ).

Applications

The theory of buildings has important applications in several rather disparate fields. Besides the already mentioned connections with the structure of reductive algebraic groups over general and local fields, buildings are used to study their representations. The results of Tits on determination of a group by its building have deep connections with rigidity theorems of George Mostow and Grigory Margulis, and with Margulis arithmeticity.

Special types of buildings are studied in discrete mathematics, and the idea of a geometric approach to characterizing simple groups proved very fruitful in the classification of finite simple groups. The theory of buildings of type more general than spherical or affine is still relatively undeveloped, but these generalized buildings have already found applications to construction of Kac–Moody groups in algebra, and to nonpositively curved manifolds and hyperbolic groups in topology and geometric group theory.

See also 

 Buekenhout geometry
 Coxeter group
  pair
 Affine Hecke algebra
 Bruhat decomposition
 Generalized polygon
 Mostow rigidity
 Coxeter complex
 Weyl distance function

References

External links
 Rousseau: Euclidean Buildings

Group theory
Algebraic combinatorics
Geometric group theory
Mathematical structures